Poha/Pohe is an Indian breakfast and snack prepared in the cuisines of Indian states of Maharashtra, Odisha, West Bengal, Madhya Pradesh, Telangana, Karnataka, Kerala, TamilNadu, Gujarat, Goa and Rajasthan.

Preparation 
Each Indian state has its own version of this tasty snack. In the state of Maharashtra this dish is typically called as 'Kande pohe' meaning Pohe with onions. To prepare this dish pohe (flattened and processed rice) is first soaked and rinsed in water, then drained and cooked with onions, potatoes and roasted peanuts with a tadka of mustard seeds, hing, turmeric, cumin seeds, fresh green chilies, and kadipatta (or curry leaves). It is a popular snack that is also sold in local restaurants and food stalls. In home recipes people also add other vegetables such as peas and corn to it. 

Other simple variations in the Southern states include cooking it in sour buttermilk with only a tadka of green chillies, mustard seeds, urad dal, and kadipatta.

In popular culture 
In Maharashtra, pohe are also associated with the meetings for arranged marriages. The term 'Chaha pohe' is often used to describe such a meeting that is accompanied by Chai and Kande pohe.

Based on the same meaning, this dish also featured in the lyrics of a marathi song 'Kande pohe' from Movie Sanai Choughade.

See also
Indori Poha

References 

Indian fast food
Maharashtrian cuisine
Rice dishes
Indian snack foods
Indian rice dishes